In geometry, the -ellipse is a generalization of the ellipse allowing more than two foci.  -ellipses go by numerous other names, including multifocal ellipse, polyellipse, egglipse,  -ellipse, and Tschirnhaus'sche Eikurve (after Ehrenfried Walther von Tschirnhaus).  They were first investigated by James Clerk Maxwell in 1846.

Given  focal points  in a plane, an -ellipse is the locus of points of the plane whose sum of distances to the  foci is a constant . In formulas, this is the set

 

The 1-ellipse is the circle, and the 2-ellipse is the classic ellipse. Both are algebraic curves of degree 2.

For any number  of foci, the -ellipse is a closed, convex curve. The curve is smooth unless it goes through a focus. 

The n-ellipse is in general a subset of the points satisfying a particular algebraic equation.

n-ellipses are special cases of spectrahedra.

See also
Generalized conic

References

Further reading
P.L. Rosin: "On the Construction of Ovals"
B. Sturmfels: "The Geometry of Semidefinite Programming", pp. 9–16.

Conic sections
Algebraic curves